A library branch, branch library or community library is a library that forms part of a library system but are not located in the same area, building or city, but use the same library classification for their catalogs and are interconnected with all the branches of the system that form part of the systems and to library patrons through an integrated library system.

Some country's municipalities have their own library system, for example: London Public Library (Canada) with 16 library branches, Helsinki Metropolitan Area Libraries with 63 libraries, National Library of Venezuela with 685 branches.

Some popular library branches include New York Public Library Main Branch, part of New York Public Library System, and Martin Luther King Jr. Memorial Library, a branch of District of Columbia Public Library System.

References

Library management